From List of National Natural Landmarks, these are the National Natural Landmarks in Tennessee.  There are 13 in total.

Tennessee
National Natural Landmarks